Charles Caspar Fitzberger (February 13, 1904 – January 25, 1965) was a Major League Baseball player for the Boston Braves just at the end of the 1928 season (September 11-September 25).  The 24-year-old rookie made seven pinch-hitting appearances for the Braves and did not play in the field, so his position is not known.  He went 2-for-7 for a batting average of .286.

All seven of Fitzberger's appearances took place at the home park, Braves Field.  His major league debut on September 11, 1928 was against the New York Giants.  His last appearance was against the Pittsburgh Pirates.

Fitzberger died in his hometown of Baltimore, Maryland, at the age of 60.

Trivia
Fitzberger shares exactly the same birthday (February 13, 1904) with former Cleveland Indians first baseman Cecil Bolton.
He played in his first MLB game on the same day that Ty Cobb played his last (September 11, 1928).

External links
Baseball Reference
Retrosheet

Baseball players from Baltimore
Boston Braves players
1904 births
1965 deaths